General John Dale Ryan (December 10, 1915 – October 27, 1983) was the seventh Chief of Staff of the United States Air Force. As chief of staff of the U.S. Air Force, General Ryan served in a dual capacity. He was a member of the Joint Chiefs of Staff, which, as a body, acts as the principal military advisers to the president, the National Security Council, and the Secretary of Defense. In his other capacity, he was responsible to the Secretary of the Air Force for managing the vast human and materiel resources of the world's most powerful aerospace force.

In May 1972, Ryan was the subject of one of President Richard Nixon's more severe rants.

Early life
John Dale Ryan was born in Cherokee, Iowa, on December 10, 1915. Following graduation from Cherokee Junior College in 1934, he entered the United States Military Academy, played varsity football, and graduated in 1938. He next attended pilot training in Texas at Randolph and Kelly fields, and received his pilot wings in 1939.

Military career

Ryan remained at Kelly Field as a flight instructor for approximately two years. From January 1942 until August 1943, he was director of training at Midland Army Airfield, Texas, and was instrumental in establishing an advanced bombardier training school. His next assignment was as operations officer for the Second Air Force at Colorado Springs, Colorado. In February 1944, he was transferred to Italy, where he commanded the 2d Bombardment Group and later became operations officer for the 5th Bombardment Wing, Fifteenth Air Force. While commanding the 2d Bombardment Group he lost a finger to enemy anti-aircraft fire. Later on, this resulted in his nickname, sometimes used derisively, "Three-fingered Jack."

Ryan returned to Texas in April 1945, and became deputy air base commander at Midland Army Airfield. In September, he was assigned to the Air Training Command at Fort Worth and Randolph Field, where he remained until April 1946, when he assumed duties with the 58th Bombardment Wing and participated in the Bikini Atoll atomic weapons tests.

From September 1946 to July 1948, he was assistant chief of staff for pilots of the 58th Bombardment Wing and then Eighth Air Force director of operations. For the next three years, he commanded the 509th Bombardment Group at Walker Air Force Base, New Mexico. Between July 1951 and June 1956, Ryan commanded the 97th Bombardment Wing and the 810th Air Division, both at Biggs Air Force Base, Texas, and the 19th Air Division at Carswell Air Force Base, Texas.

Ryan became director of materiel for the Strategic Air Command in June 1956, and four years later assumed command of SAC's Sixteenth Air Force in Spain. In July 1961, he was named commander of the Second Air Force at Barksdale Air Force Base, Louisiana. In August 1963, Ryan was assigned to the Pentagon as Inspector General of the Air Force. A year later, he was named vice commander in chief of the Strategic Air Command (SAC) at Offutt Air Force Base, Nebraska.

Strategic Air Command 

In November 1964 Ryan was appointed as the next Commanders-in-Chief of The Strategic Air Command (CINCSAC) following the retirement of the current CINCSAC General Thomas S. Power. Ryan assumed his duties as CINCSAC On December 1, 1964, and became its fourth commander in chief and was the first CINCSAC to be educated at West Point. During his tenure as Strategic Air Command Commander, Ryan oversaw the early staged of Strategic Bombing campaign during the Vietnam War and also Strategic Air Command role within the war. As part of the Strategic Air Command involvement in the Vietnam War, Ryan under the direction of Secretary of Defense Robert McNamara ordered the deployment of several Strategic Air Command fleet of B-52 Stratofortress and Boeing KC-135 Stratotanker into Southeast Asia. The B-52 and Boeing KC-135 fleet was then deployed into U-Tapao Royal Thai Navy Airfield following an agreement with Governments of Thailand and operating the base in-cooperation with Royal Thai Navy. As a result, the U-Tapao airbase became the main Strategic Air Command base for its Southeast Asian operation, especially for its operation for the Vietnam War air campaign.

Ryan also the early staged of Operation Arc Light, which purpose was to provide bombing support that include enemy bases and supply routes and also providing air support for gorund combat operations. In order to support the Operation Arc Light, several fleet of Strategic Air Command's Bombers Aircraft, including its fleet of B-52 Stratofortress was deployed into Andresen Air Force Base in Guam and Kadena Air Force Base in Okinawa, Japan. Operation Arc Light played crucial role in the strategic bombing campaign during the Vietnam War and especially in providing the bombing air support to ground combat troops in the battlefield of Vietnam.

On February 1, 1967, Ryan was assigned as commander in chief, of The Pacific Air Forces and was succeeded by his Vice Commanders-in-Chief General Joseph J. Nazzaro, who assumed Ryan's position as Strategic Air Command Commanders-in-Chief.

Air Force Chief of Staff 

Ryan returned to the Pentagon as Vice Chief of Staff of The United States Air Force in August 1968, following the appointment of the previous Air Force Vice Chief of Staff, General Bruce K. Holloway, as Commander of the Strategic Air Command. In July 1969 following the retirement of Air Force Chief of Staff General John P. McConnell, Ryan was appointed by President Richard Nixon as Chief of Staff of The United States Air Force in August 1969. One of the more controversial moves of his tenure was the disbandment of the U.S. Air Force Pipes and Drums, the only free-standing, full-time pipe band in the U.S. armed forces.

Ryan's tenure as commander of PACAF and later as Air Force Chief of Staff also engendered controversy when he was described as one of a group that helped destroy General Jack Lavelle's career after Lavelle gave fighter pilots permission to shoot back at bona fide threats, something previously denied them by rules of engagement. This was also related to the court-martial of Colonel Jack Broughton, after Broughton attempted to protect one of his pilots who shot back at an anti-aircraft position also in apparent violation of rules of engagement. Ryan's "undue command influence" later resulted in the overturning and expungement of Broughton's conviction by the USAF Board for the Correction of Military Records. During his tenure as Air Force Chief of Staff, Ryan also realized that the Air Force was in need of a complete overhaul that emphasized training, readiness and understanding.

According to Mark Perry 1989 military history book Four Stars: The Inside Story of The Forty-Year Battle Between The Joint Chiefs of Staff and America's Civilian Leaders, Ryan was considered one of the Air Force's major air power strategists in the end of 1960s and was one of the able successors to Curtis LeMay and Thomas D. White. Ryan was also quoted as one of the military's leading critics of the can-do spirit which permeated the New Frontier-Great Society national Leadership. Ryan was also quoted as one of the more outspoken and "stronger Chiefs" within the Joint Chiefs of Staff parlance, especially regarding the slanting of a policy or story that far beyond the truth.

General Ryan retired from active-duty within the United States Air Force on July 31, 1973, following 35 years of service within the Air Force. He was succeeded by General George S. Brown who assumed Ryan's position as Chief of Staff of The United States Air Force and was previously served as Commanders of Air Force System Command.

Family and death 

Ryan's son, General Michael E. Ryan, also held the position of chief of staff. Unlike the elder Ryan's career as bomber pilot, the younger Ryan (b. 1941) and his brother John (1940–1970) were both fighter pilots.

Ryan died of a heart attack at age 67 on October 27, 1983, while hospitalized at the Air Force's Wilford Hall Medical Center adjacent to Lackland AFB in San Antonio, Texas. He was later buried with full military honors at the United States Air Force Academy Cemetery in Colorado Springs, Colorado. He was survived by his wife, the former Jo Carolyn Guidera, his son, Colonel (later General) Michael E. Ryan, and a daughter, Patricia Jo Ryan. Another son, Captain John D. Ryan, Jr., was killed in 1970 when his F-4 Phantom II crashed into San Pablo Bay during a training mission, shortly after takeoff from Hamilton AFB in Marin County, California.

Awards and decorations

Other achievements
In December 1962, he joined a select group of athletes, who have been successful in their professional careers since their college football days, when he was chosen a member of the Sports Illustrated Silver Anniversary All-American team. He received an honorary doctor of laws degree from Creighton University, Omaha, Nebraska, on May 30, 1966; and an honorary doctor of laws degree from the University of Akron, Ohio, on June 5, 1967.

In July 1971, Ryan became the first foreign dignitary to receive the Golden Wings of the Philippine Air Force. Additional foreign decorations are Chilean Military Star of the Armed Forces, Class of Great Star for Military Merit.

References

External links

Public domain biography provided by the U.S. Air Force

 "Retiring AF Chief's 'Junket' Raises Flap," The Pittsburgh Press, July 13, 1973, p. 7

United States Air Force generals
1915 births
1983 deaths
Chiefs of Staff of the United States Air Force
United States Military Academy alumni
Recipients of the Distinguished Service Medal (US Army)
Recipients of the Silver Star
Recipients of the Legion of Merit
Recipients of the Distinguished Flying Cross (United States)
Recipients of the Gallantry Cross (Vietnam)
Recipients of the Air Medal
Recipients of the Croix de Guerre (France)
Order of National Security Merit members
3 Ryan, John Dale
Grand Crosses of the Order of the Phoenix (Greece)

Commandeurs of the Légion d'honneur
People from Midland, Texas
United States Army Air Forces pilots of World War II
United States Army Air Forces generals
People from Cherokee, Iowa
Vice Chiefs of Staff of the United States Air Force
Recipients of the Air Force Distinguished Service Medal
Military personnel from Texas
Military personnel from Iowa